This list of episodes of Conan details information on the 2018 episodes of Conan, a television program on TBS hosted by Conan O'Brien.

2018

January

February

March

April

May

June

July

August

September

October

November

References

Episodes (2018)
Lists of variety television series episodes
2018-related lists